Damane Jerrel Duckett (born January 21, 1981 in Waterbury, Connecticut) is a former American football offensive tackle. He most recently played for the BC Lions of the Canadian Football League. He was signed by the Carolina Panthers as an undrafted free agent in 2004. He played college football at East Carolina.

Duckett has also been a member of the New York Giants, San Francisco 49ers, and New England Patriots.

References

External links
New England Patriots bio
San Francisco 49ers bio 

Players of American football from Connecticut
American football defensive tackles
American football offensive tackles
Canadian football offensive linemen
American players of Canadian football
East Carolina Pirates football players
Carolina Panthers players
New York Giants players
San Francisco 49ers players
New England Patriots players
BC Lions players
1981 births
Living people